Winborne is a surname. Notable people with the surname include:

Hughes Winborne (born 1953), American film editor
Jamaine Winborne (born 1980), American football player
J. Wallace Winborne (1884–1966), American jurist